The 2012 Bandy World Championship was an edition of the top annual event in international bandy, held between January 29 and February 5, 2012, in Almaty, Kazakhstan. 14 countries participated in the 2012 championships: Finland, Kazakhstan, Norway, Russia, Sweden, the United States  (group A), Belarus, Canada, Hungary, Latvia, and the Netherlands (group B), and Estonia, Japan, and Kyrgyzstan (group C). Group C was introduced, and 14 teams made the record number for Bandy World Championships. The qualifiers match between the team in the last place in Group A and the first team in Group B was not played. The United States, who finished sixth in Group A, in 2013 will play in group B, and Belarus, the winner of Group B, will play in 2013 in Group A. Estonia, the winner of Group C, will play in Group B in 2013. The team relegated to Group C was not the last of Group B, but Mongolia, because they withdrew late from the tournament.

Sweden, which were the 2010 champion but in 2011 only finished third, became the champion again. Russia, the defending champion, lost to Sweden in the finals. Kazakhstan took the bronze medal, for the third time in their history.

The semifinal match between Kazakhstan and Sweden, which Sweden won on penalties, ended in a controversy, since the Swedish player Daniel Mossberg was not listed in the paperwork submitted by Sweden before the match. Kazakhstan filed a protest. As the result, Sweden were fined, but the result was kept, and Sweden went on to the finals against Russia.

Squads

Group A

Preliminary round

Knockout phase

Semi-finals

Match for third place

Final

Group B

Preliminary round

Final tour

Match for fourth place

Match for second place

Group C

Preliminary round 
Note - Matches were of 60 minutes duration rather than the standard 90 minutes in Groups A and B.'

Final tour

Match for second place

Gallery

References 

B
B
2012
International bandy competitions hosted by Kazakhstan
Sports competitions in Almaty
January 2012 sports events in Asia
February 2012 sports events in Asia
21st century in Almaty